Ophiocordyceps arborescens is an entomopathogenic fungus belonging to the order Hypocreales (Ascomycota) in the family Ophiocordycipitaceae. It produces superficial, oval perithecia at the apex of its stroma, and also multiseptate ascospores, while producing Hirsutella-type anamorphs on growth culture media. They are particularly distinguished by the shape and size of their stroma.

References

Further reading
 Araújo, João, et al. "Unravelling the diversity behind Ophiocordyceps unilateralis complex: Three new species of Zombie-Ant fungus from Brazilian Amazon." bioRxiv (2014): 003806.

External links
 

Insect diseases
Animal fungal diseases
Fungi described in 2014
Ophiocordycipitaceae